Nepenthes ampullaria (Latin ampulla meaning "flask") is a very distinctive and widespread species of tropical pitcher plant, present in Borneo, the Maluku Islands, New Guinea, Peninsular Malaysia, Singapore, Sumatra, and Thailand.

Nepenthes ampullaria, unlike other members of its genus, has evolved away from carnivory and the plants are partly detritivores, collecting and digesting falling leaf litter in their pitchers.

In the 1996 book Pitcher-Plants of Borneo, N. ampullaria is given the vernacular name flask-shaped pitcher-plant. This name, along with all others, was dropped from the much-expanded second edition, published in 2008.

Description

Due to its unique pitcher morphology and unusual growth habit, it is difficult to confuse N. ampullaria with any other species in the genus. Francis Ernest Lloyd translated Troll's 1932 account of this species as follows:

"I came across N. ampullaria among the massive vegetations of a swamp-forest on the island of Siberut off the west coast of Sumatra. It was a fabulous, unforgettable sight. Everywhere, through the network of lianas the peculiarly-formed pitchers of this species gleamed forth, often in tight clusters and, most remarkably, the muddy moss-overgrown soil was spotted with the pitchers of this plant, so that one got the impression of a carpet."

The stem of N. ampullaria is light brown in colour and may climb to 15 m in height. Leaves are light green, up to 25 cm long, and 6 cm wide. Pitchers are produced at the ends of short tendrils no more than 15 cm long.

The urceolate pitchers are generally quite small, rarely exceeding 10 cm in height and 7 cm in width. The peristome is greatly incurved, with the inner section accounting for around 85% of its total cross-sectional surface length. Upper pitchers are very rarely produced and are considerably smaller than those formed on rosettes or offshoots. Pitchers range in colouration from light green throughout to completely dark red, with many intermediate forms recorded. The pitchers of N. ampullaria from Sumatra and Peninsular Malaysia are almost exclusively green throughout or green with red speckles; the red forms are mostly confined to Borneo. A large-pitchered form has been recorded from New Guinea.

The inflorescence of N. ampullaria is a dense panicle. It is the only Nepenthes species recorded from Sumatra or Peninsular Malaysia that produces paniculate inflorescences.

All parts of the plant are densely covered with short, brown hairs when young. The indumentum of mature plants is more sparse, except on the inflorescenes.

Distribution and habitat
One of the most widespread Nepenthes species, N. ampullaria is native to Borneo, the Maluku Islands, New Guinea, Peninsular Malaysia, Singapore, Sumatra, and Thailand. It has also been recorded from many smaller islands, including Bangka, Bengkalis, Ko Lanta, Ko Tarutao, Langkawi, Mendol, the Mentawai Islands (Siberut), the Meranti Islands (Padang, Rangsang, Tebing Tinggi), Nias, Penang, the Riau Islands (Lingga Islands, Natuna Islands, Riau Archipelago), and Rupat.

Nepenthes ampullaria generally grows in damp, shady forest from sea-level to 2100 m altitude. In Borneo, it occurs usually on relatively flat terrain in kerangas forest, peat swamp forest, and degraded swamp forest, at elevations of 0 to 1000 m.

In Sumatra and Peninsular Malaysia, it grows from sea-level to 1100 m altitude on flat terrain in heath forest, padang (meaning "field" in Malay), belukar, peat swamp forest, degraded swamp forest, and in padi fields.

In New Guinea, it is predominantly present in Araucaria forests. The species has also been recorded from secondary forests, open microphyllous vegetation, and swamp grassland.

Carnivory

Nepenthes ampullaria has largely moved away from carnivory and acquires a substantial portion of its nutrients from digesting leaf matter that falls to the forest floor.  It is thus partially detritivorous.

The species has developed several unique traits as a consequence of its adaptation to trapping leaf litter:

 It is one of the few species in the genus to lack "lunate" cells in its pitchers. These are modified stomatal guard cells which, it is thought, deny prey a foothold in the pitcher.
 The pitcher lid is atypical, being very small and reflexed, such that leaf litter is allowed to fall directly into the pitcher.
 Nectar glands, which play an important role in prey capture, are very rare and in some cases completely absent from the pitcher lid.
 The marginal glands of the peristome are greatly reduced compared to those of other species.
 In terrestrial pitchers, the glandular region extends almost to the peristome, such that there is little or no conductive waxy zone. The waxy zone functions by causing prey to slip and fall into the digestive fluid.
 The plant's architecture, consisting of subsurface runners and offshoots, is unusual for the genus.  The species often forms a "carpet" of pitchers covering the soil. This serves to maximise the area over which falling debris may be intercepted.
 The pitchers of N. ampullaria are relatively long-lived, as the species relies on a slow accumulation of nutrients over time.
 It is thought that infaunal organisms, such as mosquito larvae, facilitate breakdown of leaf litter and aid in the transfer of nitrogen from it to the plant by means of the excretion of ammonium ions. Bacterial breakdown of leaf matter is also known to produce ammonium ions.

It has been shown that foliar stable nitrogen isotope (15N) abundance in N. ampullaria plants growing under forest canopy (litterfall present) is significantly lower than in plants without access to litterfall. Conversely, total nitrogen concentrations are higher in these plants compared to those growing in open sites with no litterfall. A 2003 study estimated that N. ampullaria plants growing under forest canopy derive 35.7% (±0.1%) of their foliar nitrogen from leaf litter. A 2011 study found that N. ampullaria derives 41.7% (±5.5%) of its laminar nitrogen and 54.8% (±7.0%) of its pitcher nitrogen from leaf litter, and showed that detritivory increased the rate of net photosynthesis in the laminae.

Pitcher infauna
At least 59 infaunal species have been recorded from the pitchers of N. ampullaria. Among these are one of the smallest known species of Old World frog, Microhyla nepenthicola, and the crab spider, Misumenops nepenthicola. The bacterial communities found in the pitchers of this species have also been studied.

Infraspecific taxa

The most recently described variety, N. ampullaria var. racemosa, occurs in Sarawak and has a racemose inflorescence. B. H. Danser considered the other varieties to be unimportant. A complete list of published varietal names includes:

N. ampullacea var. picta Hort.Parker ex Rafarin (1869)
N. ampullacea var. vittata Hort.Van Houtte ex Rafarin (1869)
N. ampullaria var. geelvinkiana Becc. (1886)
N. ampullaria var. guttata D.Moore (1872)
N. ampullaria var. longicarpa Becc. (1886)
N. ampullaria var. microsepala Macfarl. (1911)
N. ampullaria var. papuana Becc. in sched. nom.nud.

N. ampullaria var. racemosa J.H.Adam & Wilcock (1990)
N. ampullaria var. viridis Hort. ex Teijsm. (1859) nom.nud.

N. ampullaria var. vittata-major Mast. (1872)

Natural hybrids

N. ampullaria flowers once or twice annually for several weeks at a time. Its flowering period often coincides with those of other Nepenthes species; consequently, it readily forms natural hybrids. The following natural hybrids involving N. ampullaria have been recorded.

N. albomarginata × N. ampullaria
N. ampullaria × N. bicalcarata
N. ampullaria × N. eustachya
N. ampullaria × N. gracilis [=N. × trichocarpa]
(N. ampullaria × N. gracilis) × N. bicalcarata [=N. × trichocarpa × N. bicalcarata]
N. ampullaria × N. hemsleyana
N. ampullaria × N. hirsuta
N. ampullaria × N. mirabilis [=N. × kuchingensis, Nepenthes cutinensis]
N. ampullaria × N. neoguineensis
N. ampullaria × N. rafflesiana [=N. × hookeriana]
? (N. ampullaria × N. rafflesiana) × N. mirabilis [=N. × hookeriana × N. mirabilis]
N. ampullaria × N. reinwardtiana
N. ampullaria × N. spathulata
N. ampullaria × N. tobaica

References

Further reading

 [Anonymous] 1881. Messrs. Veitch's Nepenthes-house. The Gardeners' Chronicle, new series, 16(410): 598–599.
 [Anonymous] 1883. Mr. A. E. Ratcliff's Nepenthes. The Gardeners' Chronicle 20(497): 18–19.
 Adam, J.H., C.C. Wilcock & M.D. Swaine 1992. The ecology and distribution of Bornean Nepenthes. Journal of Tropical Forest Science 5(1): 13–25.
 Adam, J.H. 1997. Prey spectra of Bornean Nepenthes species (Nepenthaceae) in relation to their habitat. Pertanika Journal of Tropical Agricultural Science 20(2–3): 121–134.
 Adam, J.H. & C.C. Wilcock 1999. Palynological study of Bornean Nepenthes (Nepenthaceae). Pertanika Journal of Tropical Agricultural Science 22(1): 1–7.
  Adam, J.H., J.N. Maisarah, A.T.S. Norhafizah, A.H. Hafiza, M.Y. Harun & O.A. Rahim et al. 2009. Ciri Tanih Pada Habitat Nepenthes (Nepenthaceae) di Padang Tujuh, Taman Negeri Endau-Rompin Pahang. [Soil Properties in Nepenthes (Nepenthaceae) Habitat at Padang Tujuh, Endau-Rompin State Park, Pahang.] In: J.H. Adam, G.M. Barzani & S. Zaini (eds.) Bio-Kejuruteraan and Kelestarian Ekosistem. [Bio-Engineering and Sustainable Ecosystem.] Kumpulan Penyelidikan Kesihatan Persekitaran, Pusat Penyelidikan Bukit Fraser and Universiti Kebangsaan, Malaysia. pp. 147–157.
  André, E. 1877. Nepenthes ampullaria, Jack. Nepenthes ampullaria var. vittata major.. L'Illustration horticole: revue mensuelle des serres et des jardins 24: 45–46, t. 272. (alternate scan)
  Baloari, G., R. Linda & Mukarlina 2013. Keanekaragaman jenis dan pola distribusi Nepenthes spp di Gunung Semahung Kecamatan Sengah Temila Kabupaten Landak. Protobiont 2(1): 1–6. Abstract 
 Beaman, J.H. & C. Anderson 2004. The Plants of Mount Kinabalu: 5. Dicotyledon Families Magnoliaceae to Winteraceae. Natural History Publications (Borneo), Kota Kinabalu.
  Besnard, J. 1991. Nepenthes ampullaria "Cantley's red". Dionée 23.
 Beveridge, N.G.P., C. Rauch, P.J.A. Keßler, R.R. van Vugt & P.C. van Welzen 2013. A new way to identify living species of Nepenthes (Nepenthaceae): more data needed! Carnivorous Plant Newsletter 42(4): 122–128.
  Blume, C.L. 1852. Ord. Nepenthaceae. In: Museum Botanicum Lugduno-Batavum, sive stirpium exoticarum novarum vel minus cognitarum ex vivis aut siccis brevis expositio. Tom. II. Nr. 1. E.J. Brill, Lugduni-Batavorum. pp. 5–10.
 Bonhomme, V., H. Pelloux-Prayer, E. Jousselin, Y. Forterre, J.-J. Labat & L. Gaume 2011. Slippery or sticky? Functional diversity in the trapping strategy of Nepenthes carnivorous plants. New Phytologist 191(2): 545–554. 
 Bourke, G. 2011. The Nepenthes of Mulu National Park. Carniflora Australis 8(1): 20–31.
 Brearley, F.Q. & M. Mansur 2012. Nutrient stoichiometry of Nepenthes species from a Bornean peat swamp forest. Carnivorous Plant Newsletter 41(3): 105–108.
 Burnett, J.B., M. Davies & G. Taylor (eds.) 2003. Flora and Fauna Survey of the Tangguh LNG Site Papua Province, Indonesia. P.T. Hatfindo Prima, Bogor. 
 Chung, A.Y.C. 2006. Biodiversity and Conservation of The Meliau Range: A Rain Forest in Sabah's Ultramafic Belt. Natural History Publications (Borneo), Kota Kinabalu. .
 Clarke, C.M. & J.A. Moran 1994. A further record of aerial pitchers in Nepenthes ampullaria Jack. Malayan Nature Journal 47: 321–323.
 Cresswell, J.E. 1998. Morphological correlates of necromass accumulation in the traps of an Eastern tropical pitcher plant, Nepenthes ampullaria Jack, and observations on the pitcher infauna and its reconstitution following experimental removal. Oecologia 113(3): 383–390. 
  Desti 2009. Anatomi daun dua jenis kantung semar (Nepenthes ampullaria Jack dan Nepenthes singalana Becc.). Thesis, Andalas University, Padang. Abstract 
  Deswita, E. 2010. Perkembangan ginesium beberapa jenis Nepenthes (N. ampullaria Jack., N. gracilis Korth. dan N. reinwardtiana Miq.). Thesis, Andalas University, Padang. Abstract 
 Dixon, W.E. 1889. Nepenthes. The Gardeners' Chronicle, series 3, 6(144): 354.
  Enjelina, W. 2012. Analisis hibrid alam kantung semar (Nepenthes) di Bukit Taratak Kabupaten Pesisir Selatan Sumatera Barat dengan teknik RAPD. MSc thesis, Andalas University, Padang. 
 Fashing, N.J. 2010. Two novel adaptations for dispersal in the mite family Histiostomatidae (Astigmata). In: M.W. Sabelis & J. Bruin (eds.) Trends in Acarology: Proceedings of the 12th International Congress. Springer Science, Dordrecht. pp. 81–84. 
 Frazier, C.K. 2000. Reproductive isolating mechanisms and fitness among tropical pitcher plants (Nepenthes) and their hybrids. [video] The 3rd Conference of the International Carnivorous Plant Society, San Francisco, USA.
 Green, T.L. & S. Green 1964. Stem pitchers on Nepenthes ampullaria. Malayan Nature Journal 18: 209–211.
  Hanafi, H. 2010. Pertumbuhan Nepenthes ampullaria Jack. pada medium MS modifikasi dan penambahan beberapa konsentrasi BAP. Thesis, Andalas University, Padang. Abstract 
  Hanafiah, L. 2008. Studi habitat Nepenthes ampullaria Jack di Kawasan Taman Wisata Alam Lembah Harau. MSc thesis, Andalas University, Padang. Abstract 
  Handayani, T. 1999. Konservasi Nepenthes di kebun raya Indonesia. [Conservation of Nepenthes in Indonesian botanic gardens.] In: A. Mardiastuti, I. Sudirman, K.G. Wiryawan, L.I. Sudirman, M.P. Tampubolon, R. Megia & Y. Lestari (eds.) Prosiding II: Seminar Hasil-Hasil Penelitian Bidang Ilmu Hayat. Pusat Antar Universitas Ilmu Hayat IPB, Bogor. pp. 365–372.
  Handayani, T. & R. Hendrian 1999. Strategi konservasi Nepenthes ampullaria Jack. [Conservation strategy of Nepenthes ampullaria Jack.] In: Workshop & Promosi Flora Kawasan Timur Indonesia. Kebun Raya Ekakarya Bali, Lembaga Ilmu Pengetahuan Indonesia, Bogor. pp. 1–6.
 Handayani, T., D. Latifah & Dodo 2005. Diversity and growth behaviour of Nepenthes (pitcher plants) in Tanjung Puting National Park, Central Kalimantan Province. Biodiversitas 6(4): 248–252 .  Cover 
 Hansen, E. 2001. Where rocks sing, ants swim, and plants eat animals: finding members of the Nepenthes carnivorous plant family in Borneo. Discover 22(10): 60–68.
 Hernawati & P. Akhriadi 2006. A Field Guide to the Nepenthes of Sumatra. PILI-NGO Movement, Bogor.
 Hirst, S. 1928. A new tyroglyphid mite (Zwickia nepenthesiana sp. n.) from the pitchers of Nepenthes ampullaria. Journal of the Malayan Branch of the British Royal Asiatic Society 6: 19–22.
 Hooker, J.D. 1859. XXXV. On the origin and development of the pitchers of Nepenthes, with an account of some new Bornean plants of that genus. The Transactions of the Linnean Society of London 22(4): 415–424. 
 Hwee, K.C. 1996. Carnivorous plants and sites in Singapore. Bulletin of the Australian Carnivorous Plant Society, Inc. 15(4): 12–15.
 Kato, M., M. Hotta, R. Tamin & T. Itino 1993. Inter- and intra-specific variation in prey assemblages and inhabitant communities in Nepenthes pitchers in Sumatra. Tropical Zoology 6(1): 11–25. Abstract
 Kitching, R.L. 2000. Food Webs and Container Habitats: The natural history and ecology of phytotelmata. Cambridge University Press, Cambridge.
 Korthals, P.W. 1839. Over het geslacht Nepenthes. In: C.J. Temminck 1839–1842. Verhandelingen over de Natuurlijke Geschiedenis der Nederlandsche overzeesche bezittingen; Kruidkunde. Leiden. pp. 1–44, t. 1–4, 13–15, 20–22.
  Koudela, I. 1998. Klíčí nebo neklíčí. Trifid 1998(2): 36–37. (page 2)
 Kurup, R., A.J. Johnson, S. Sankar, A.A. Hussain, C.S. Kumar & S. Baby 2013. Fluorescent prey traps in carnivorous plants. Plant Biology 15(3): 611–615. 
 Lam, S.Y. 1982. Tripteroides aranoides (Theobald) in two pitcher plants, Nepenthes ampullaria Jack and N. gracilis Korth., at Kent Ridge (Diptera: Culicidae). BSc (Hons.) thesis, National University of Singapore.
 Lecoufle, M. 1990. Nepenthes ampullaria. In: Carnivorous Plants: Care and Cultivation. Blandford, London. pp. 130–131.
 Lee, C.C. 2000. Recent Nepenthes Discoveries. [video] The 3rd Conference of the International Carnivorous Plant Society, San Francisco, USA.
 Lim, S.H., D.C.Y. Phua & H.T.W. Tan 2000. Primer design and optimization for RAPD analysis of Nepenthes. Biologia Plantarum 43(1): 153–155. 
 Macfarlane, J.M. 1914. Family XCVI. Nepenthaceæ. [pp. 279–288] In: J.S. Gamble. Materials for a flora of the Malayan Peninsula, No. 24. Journal & Proceedings of the Asiatic Society of Bengal 75(3): 279–391.
  Mansur, M. 2001. Koleksi Nepenthes di Herbarium Bogoriense: prospeknya sebagai tanaman hias. In: Prosiding Seminar Hari Cinta Puspa dan Satwa Nasional. Lembaga Ilmu Pengetahuan Indonesia, Bogor. pp. 244–253. 
  Mansur, M. 2007. Keanekaragaman jenis Nepenthes (kantong semar) dataran rendah di Kalimantan Tengah. [Diversity of lowland Nepenthes (kantong semar) in Central Kalimantan.] Berita Biologi 8(5): 335–341. Abstract
  Mansur, M. 2008. Penelitian ekologi Nepenthes di Laboratorium Alam Hutan Gambut Sabangau Kereng Bangkirai Kalimantan Tengah. [Ecological studies on Nepenthes at Peat Swamps Forest Natural Laboratory, Kereng Bangkirai Sabangau, Central Kalimantan.] Jurnal Teknologi Lingkungan 9(1): 67–73. Abstract 
 Mansur, M. & F.Q. Brearley 2008. Ecological studies on Nepenthes at Barito Ulu, Central Kalimantan, Indonesia. Jurnal Teknologi Lingkungan 9(3): 271–276.
  Marwinski, D. 2014. Eine Expedition nach West-Papua oder auf den Spuren von Nepenthes paniculata. Das Taublatt 78: 11–44.
 McPherson, S.R. & A. Robinson 2012. Field Guide to the Pitcher Plants of Borneo. Redfern Natural History Productions, Poole.
 Meimberg, H., A. Wistuba, P. Dittrich & G. Heubl 2001. Molecular phylogeny of Nepenthaceae based on cladistic analysis of plastid trnK intron sequence data. Plant Biology 3(2): 164–175. 
  Meimberg, H. 2002. Molekular-systematische Untersuchungen an den Familien Nepenthaceae und Ancistrocladaceae sowie verwandter Taxa aus der Unterklasse Caryophyllidae s. l.. PhD thesis, Ludwig Maximilian University of Munich, Munich. 
 Meimberg, H. & G. Heubl 2006. Introduction of a nuclear marker for phylogenetic analysis of Nepenthaceae. Plant Biology 8(6): 831–840. 
 Meimberg, H., S. Thalhammer, A. Brachmann & G. Heubl 2006. Comparative analysis of a translocated copy of the trnK intron in carnivorous family Nepenthaceae. Molecular Phylogenetics and Evolution 39(2): 478–490. 
  Meriko, L. 2010. Perkembangan androesium beberapa jenis Nepenthes (N. ampullaria Jack., N. gracilis Korth. dan N. reinwardtiana Miq.). MSc thesis, Andalas University, Padang. Abstract 
 Mey, F.S. 2014. A short visit to Papua, video by Alastair Robinson and Davide Baj. Strange Fruits: A Garden's Chronicle, 25 February 2014.
 Mogi, M. & K.L. Chan 1997. Variation in communities of dipterans in Nepenthes pitchers in Singapore: predators increase prey community diversity. Annals of the Entomological Society of America 90(2): 177–183.
 Moran, J.A., W.E. Booth & J.K. Charles 1999. Aspects of pitcher morphology and spectral characteristics of six Bornean Nepenthes pitcher plant species: implications for prey capture. Annals of Botany 83: 521–528.
 Mullins, J. & M. Jebb 2009. Phylogeny and biogeography of the genus Nepenthes. National Botanic Gardens, Glasnevin. 
  Murniati, Syamswisna & A. Nurdini 2013. Pembuatan flash card dari hasil inventarisasi Nepenthes di hutan adat desa Teluk Bakung. Jurnal Pendidikan dan Pembelajaran 2(1): [unpaginated; 14 pp.] Abstract 
  Oikawa, T. 1992. Nepenthes ampullaria Jack. In: . [The Grief Vanishing.] Parco Co., Japan. pp. 34–37.
 Osunkoya, O.O., S.D. Daud & F.L. Wimmer 2008. Longevity, lignin content and construction cost of the assimilatory organs of Nepenthes species. Annals of Botany 102(5): 845–853. 
  Rahmawati, Y. 2010. Pengawetan polen Nepenthes ampullaria Jack. dengan beberapa pelarut organik. Thesis, Andalas University, Padang. Abstract 
 Rice, B. 2007. Carnivorous plants with hybrid trapping strategies. Carnivorous Plant Newsletter 36(1): 23–27.
 Ridley, H.N. 1916. Nepenthaceæ. [pp. 139–141] In: I. Report on the botany of the Wollaston Expedition to Dutch New Guinea, 1912–13. The Transactions of the Linnean Society of London, series 2: botany, 9(1): 1–269. 
 Robinson, A. 1995 ['1994/95']. Plant findings in Malaysia. The Carnivorous Plant Society Journal 18: 44–47.
 Rottloff, S., R. Stieber, H. Maischak, F.G. Turini, G. Heubl & A. Mithöfer 2011. Functional characterization of a class III acid endochitinase from the traps of the carnivorous pitcher plant genus, Nepenthes. Journal of Experimental Botany 62(13): 4639–4647. 
 Shivas, R.G. 1984. Pitcher Plants of Peninsular Malaysia & Singapore. Maruzen Asia, Kuala Lumpur.
 Slack, A. 1979. Nepenthes ampullaria. In: Carnivorous Plants. Ebury Press, London. pp. 82–84.
 Steffan, W.A. & N.L. Evenhuis 1982. A new species of Toxorhynchites from Papua New Guinea (Diptera: Culicidae). Mosquito Systematics 14(1): 1–13.
  Syamsuardi & R. Tamin 1994. Kajian kekerabatan jenis-jenis Nepenthes di Sumatera Barat. Project report, Andalas University, Padang. Abstract 
  Syamsuardi 1995. Klasifikasi numerik kantong semar (Nepenthes) di Sumatera Barat. [Numerical classification of pitcher plants (Nepenthes) in West Sumatra.] Journal Matematika dan Pengetahuan Alam 4(1): 48–57. Abstract 
 Takeuchi, Y., M.M. Salcher, M. Ushio, R. Shimizu-Inatsugi, M.J. Kobayashi, B. Diway, C. von Mering, J. Pernthaler & K.K. Shimizu 2011. In situ enzyme activity in the dissolved and particulate fraction of the fluid from four pitcher plant species of the genus Nepenthes. PLOS One 6(9): e25144. 
 Tan, W.K. & C.L. Wong 1996. Aerial pitchers of Nepenthes ampullaria. Nature Malaysiana 21(1): 12–14.
 Teo, L.L. 2001. Study of natural hybridisation in some tropical plants using amplified fragment length polymorphism analysis. MSc thesis, Nanyang Technological University, Singapore.
 Thorogood, C. 2010. The Malaysian Nepenthes: Evolutionary and Taxonomic Perspectives. Nova Science Publishers, New York.
 Wong, D. 1996. Thoughts, reflections, and upper Nepenthes ampullaria pitcher. Carnivorous Plant Newsletter 25(1): 10–14.
  Yogiara 2004. Analisis komunitas bakteri cairan kantung semar (Nepenthes spp.) menggunakan teknik terminal restriction fragment length polymorphism (T-RFLP) dan amplified ribosomul DNA restriction analysis (ARDRA). MSc thesis, Bogor Agricultural University, Bogor.
 Yogiara, A. Suwanto & M.T. Suhartono 2006. A complex bacterial community living in pitcher plant fluid. Jurnal Mikrobiologi Indonesia 11(1): 9–14.
 James Wong and the Malaysian Garden. [video] BBC Two.

External links

Photographs of N. ampullaria at the Carnivorous Plant Photofinder

Carnivorous plants of Asia
Detritivores
ampullaria
Flora of Malesia
Flora of New Guinea
Flora of Thailand